Energy 52 was a trance project of German DJ Paul M. (DJ Kid Paul). The  project was supported by Cosmic Baby (Harald Blüchel), who produced, co-composed, and remixed tracks.

The project is best known for the 1993 track "Café del Mar" which became one of the most popular trance songs of its time, being remixed a significant number of times and featuring on hundreds of compilation albums. In April 2011, the song was voted number one by BBC Radio 1 listeners in Pete Tong's Top 20 Dance Tracks of the last 20 years.

References

German DJs
German trance music groups
German dance music groups
Electronic dance music DJs